The 1991 NCAA Division I baseball tournament was played at the end of the 1991 NCAA Division I baseball season to determine the national champion of college baseball.  The tournament concluded with eight teams competing in the College World Series, a double-elimination tournament in its forty fifth year.  Eight regional competitions were held to determine the participants in the final event.  Each region was composed of six teams, resulting in 48 teams participating in the tournament at the conclusion of their regular season, and in some cases, after a conference tournament.  The forty-fifth tournament's champion was LSU, coached by Skip Bertman.  The Most Outstanding Player was Gary Hymel of LSU.

Regionals
The opening rounds of the tournament were played across eight regional sites across the country, each consisting of a six-team field. Each regional tournament is double-elimination, however region brackets are variable depending on the number of teams remaining after each round. The winners of each regional advanced to the College World Series.

Bold indicates winner.

Atlantic Regional
at Tallahassee, FL

Central Regional
at Austin, TX

East Regional
at Gainesville, FL

Midwest Regional
at Wichita, KS

Northeast Regional
at Orono, ME

South Regional
at Baton Rouge, LA

West I Regional
at Los Angeles, CA 

West II Regionalat Fresno, CA''

College World Series

Participants

Results

Bracket

Game results

All-Tournament Team
The following players were members of the College World Series All-Tournament Team.

Notable players
Clemson: Mike Holtz, Billy McMillon, Keith Williams
Creighton: Kimera Bartee, Alan Benes, Mike Heathcott, Dax Jones, Scott Stahoviak
Florida: John Burke, Herb Perry, Kevin Polcovich, Marc Valdes, Rob Bonanno
Florida State: Roger Bailey, Chris Brock, Tim Davis, Eduardo Pérez, Kenny Robinson, John Wasdin
Fresno State: Brant Brown, Bobby Jones, Steve Soderstrom, Jason Wood
Long Beach State: Brent Cookson, Jason Giambi, Steve Trachsel
LSU: Paul Byrd, Rick Greene, Lyle Mouton, Chad Ogea, Armando Ríos, Andy Sheets, Mike Sirotka
Wichita State: Jaime Bluma, Darren Dreifort, Tyler Green, Doug Mirabelli, Kennie Steenstra, Scot McCloughan

References

 

NCAA Division I Baseball Championship
 
Baseball in Austin, Texas